British Restaurants were communal kitchens created in 1940 during the Second World War to help people who had been bombed out of their homes, had run out of ration coupons or otherwise needed help. In 1943, 2,160 British Restaurants served 600,000 very inexpensive meals a day. They were disbanded in 1947. There was a political dimension as well, as the Labour Party saw them as a permanent solution to equalising consumption across the class line and guaranteeing a nourishing diet to all.

Second World War
Originally called "Community Feeding Centres", the name British Restaurants was chosen by the Prime Minister, Winston Churchill.  They were set up by the Ministry of Food and run by local government or voluntary agencies on a non-profit basis. Meals were sold for a set maximum price of 9d (equivalent to just under 4p, about US$2 or £1 in purchasing power 2008) or less. No-one could be served with a meal of more than one serving of meat, game, poultry, fish, eggs, or cheese. In one in ten restaurants the meals were prepared at central depots.  Schools and churches were often used because they had dining halls and kitchens.  In London, mobile canteens delivered meals to air raid shelters and on the street in the aftermath of air raids.

By contrast, ordinary private restaurants continued in operation and were not subject to rationing. They did have some restrictions: for instance, no meal could be more than three courses and the maximum price was five shillings.

By mid-1941, over two hundred British Restaurants operated in the London County Council area, although the Wartime Social Survey conducted in 1942–43 indicated they were more popular in London than in the rest of the country. In November 1942 there were 1,899 restaurants.  By 1943, there were some 2,160 British Restaurants across the country, serving around 600,000 meals per day for around 9d a time. 546 authorities made profits and 203 made losses, though they were set up to be not-for-profit.

Some smaller places did not qualify for a British Restaurant, but, instead, had what was termed a "Cash and Carry Restaurant" with meals being delivered from a nearby British Restaurant.

Food served 

The ministry's dietician James H. Barker authorised food based upon regional preferences and health. For example, the food served in Scotland was very different from that served in London due to the taste preferences of the inhabitants. Health was also a concern, as they were supposed to provide diners with "one third of the day's energy needs". The dieticians were especially concerned with Vitamin C intake. Due to the war efforts and rationing, fruit intake was extremely limited. Vegetables such as cabbage, which has a high percentage of Vitamin C, were a staple vegetable, in order to provide diners with beneficial nutrients. There was concern that, with mass catering, vitamins such as Vitamin C would be destroyed in the food sources.

The food in British Restaurants was said to be filling and of good quality. For 9d, customers could get a three-course meal. Traditionally, customers wanted a meal of meat and two vegetables. Generally there were choices of five meat dishes, five vegetables, and five desserts and in more populated areas even more options. Popular dishes included roasts and potatoes, which acted as a substitute for bread. The foods served in British Restaurants could be prepared in large quantities, which made them good options for feeding an abundance of people. The preparation of food was industrialised, which also helped with inexpensive, commercial food preparation. For example, volunteers sliced potatoes with machines, rather than by hand.

Post-war
After 1947 some restaurants were converted, under the Civic Restaurants Act, into civic restaurants run by the local council. In 1949, 678 still existed throughout the United Kingdom. The restaurants moved beyond the privations of wartime and into the new world of a Labour government making many changes to the social fabric of the country. The Labour Minister of Food, John Strachey, noted that "private enterprise in the catering trade has, on the whole and by and large, catered for the middle class and not for the working class."

If a civic restaurant operated at a loss for three consecutive years the act provided that ministerial consent would be needed for it to continue to remain open. These restaurants existed at least into the late 1960s; Cambridge had one until the redevelopment of Lion Yard in the early 1970s.

See also
 Rationing in the United Kingdom
 Victory garden

References

 
 

Food politics
United Kingdom home front during World War II
Restaurants in the United Kingdom
1940 establishments in the United Kingdom
1947 disestablishments in the United Kingdom
Government agencies established in 1940
Government agencies disestablished in 1947
Restaurants established in 1940
Restaurants disestablished in 1947
Defunct restaurants in the United Kingdom